Harald Schwenzen (18 May 1895 – 16 April 1954) was a Norwegian actor and director.

Born in Glücksberg, Germany, he relocated to Norway where he made his stage debut at Nationaltheatret in 1918, and played for this theatre for many years. Schwenzen was known for playing lead roles such as Don Carlos and Peer Gynt.

He made his debut as a film actor in 1920 in Victor Sjöström's film adaptation of Hjalmar Bergman's Mästerman. Schwenzen was script writer and director for the 1922 film adaption of Knut Hamsun's Pan. In 1929, he played a leading role as a lawyer Sadolin in the Norwegian film Laila.

He chaired the Norwegian Actors' Equity Association during the occupation of Norway by Nazi Germany, and was arrested and sent to Grini and Sachsenhausen concentration camps. After his release and the end of the war, he continued appearing on Norwegian stages and in films. In 1948, Schwenzen played the role of the German general von Falkenhorst in the Operation Swallow: The Battle for Heavy Water.

He died in Oslo in 1954.

Filmography

Actor

Director

Gallery

References

External links
 

1895 births
1954 deaths
20th-century Norwegian male actors
Grini concentration camp survivors

Norwegian male film actors
Norwegian male silent film actors
Norwegian male stage actors
Sachsenhausen concentration camp survivors
German emigrants to Norway